The Seal Rehabilitation and Research Centre (SRRC) is located in Pieterburen, Netherlands. 

Lenie ‘t Hart founded the centre in 1971 and the centre has evolved from a simple "day care" for young seals to a scientific research-based seal hospital, with accompanying facilities such as quarantine, a laboratory, a chemist and modern research facilities. Hundreds of seals are cared for annually. The center rescues seals that have been injured by boats or fishing nets and those that have been sickened due to pollution. The center also rescues orphaned pups. All rehabilitated seals are released into the wild after their rehabilitation period, which lasts from several weeks to a maximum of six months. None of the animals remain in captivity and none of the seals are bred. The center also collects pieces of fishing nets that float in the sea and injure the animals. The center is open to visitors daily.

In 2014 Lenie 't Hart cut ties with the centre, because she refused to accept the new scientifically based policy on the treatment of injured seals and intervened continuously with the people working there.

References

External links

 Official Website (English)

Pinnipeds
Buildings and structures in Groningen (province)